Jean-Yves Ferri (born 20 April 1959) is a French writer, designer, and colourist of comics.

On 25 July 2011, he was chosen as the writer for the next installment of the Asterix series created by René Goscinny and Albert Uderzo. Uderzo personally mentored him and Didier Conrad, who was subsequently announced as the artist. The 35th Asterix volume, Asterix and the Picts was published on 24 October 2013. The next volume, the 36th Asterix volume, Asterix and the Missing Scroll, was released on 22 October 2015 and the 37th volume, Asterix and the Chariot Race, was released in 2017.

Prizes 
Prix de l'Humour noir Grandville in 2005 (Revoir Corfou) 
Prix Jacques Lob in 2008
Prix Virgin 2005 (Le Vaste Monde)

Publications 
 Fables autonomes, Audie

Tome 1, 1996
Tome 2, 1998

 Aimé Lacapelle, Audie

Je veille aux grains, 2000
Tonnerre sur le sud-ouest, 2001
Poules rebelles, 2003
Bêtes à bon diou, 2007

Le Retour à la terre, with Manu Larcenet

 La Vraie Vie, 2002.
 Les Projets, 2003.
 Le Vaste Monde, 2005.
 Le Déluge, 2006.
 Les Révolutions, 2008.

Revoir Corfou, le recueil des dessins hors-séries, collection Azote Liquide, Audie, 2004
Correspondances, with Manu Larcenet, Les Rêveurs, coll. « M'as-tu vu », 2006.
Le Sens de la vis, with Manu Larcenet, Les Rêveurs, coll. « M'as-tu vu »,

tome 1 : Le Sens de la vis (2007)
tome 2 : Tracer le cercle (2010)

De Gaulle à la plage, Dargaud, coll. « Poisson Pilote », 2007. Couleur Patrice Larcenet.
Asterix and the Picts - 2013
Asterix and the Missing Scroll - 2015
Asterix and the Chariot Race - 2017
Asterix and the Chieftain's Daughter - 2019
Asterix and the Griffin - 2021

References 

1959 births
French male writers
French comics artists
Living people

People from Mostaganem Province
Chevaliers of the Ordre des Arts et des Lettres